The following is a list of churches in Hartlepool.

No active churches are known in the civil parishes of Dalton Piercy, Brierton, Claxton and Newton Bewley.

The borough has an estimated 37 churches for 92,500 inhabitants, a ratio of one church to every 2,500 people.

References 

Churches